Idrottsföreningen Kamraterna Kristianstad, or IFK Kristianstad, is a Swedish handball club based in Kristianstad. They play in Handbollsligan, the top level of Swedish men's handball. The club was founded in 1899 as a multi-sport club. The handball team made its debut in 1925 and has been the only section of the club since 2000. The club plays its home matches at Kristianstad Arena.

Kristianstad have won eight Swedish Championship (SM) gold medals. They won their first gold in 1941. From 1946 to 1957 they were a consistent top team, finishing in the top four every year and winning three golds. They were again a contender in the 1970s, losing the final in 1975. In the 1980s and 1990s, they mainly yo-yoed between the top two divisions. After spending the entire 2000s decade outside the top flight, Kristianstad enjoyed a massive resurgence in the 2010s, culminating in four consecutive golds from 2015 to 2018.

In 2018–19, the team had an average attendance of 4271, the highest in Swedish handball. While the club, like most Idrottsföreningen Kamraterna (IFK) clubs, has a blue and white logo, its shirt colour is orange. The club uses the slogan Sveriges häftigaste handbollsklubb ("Sweden's coolest handball club").

History

Early years (1899–1945)

IFK Kristianstad was founded on 7 November 1899 as a multi-sport club by Adolf Johnsson, a secondary school pupil from Broby. Johnsson was the first chairman of the club. The club previously had sections in field handball, football, cycling, athletics, and gymnastics as well as women's handball, but has only been a men's handball club since 2000 when the other sections formed separate clubs due to IFK Kristianstad's financial troubles. The first City Championship in handball in Kristianstad was played in 1925. IFK Kristianstad competed against school and armed forces teams, as well as rival clubs. IFK Kristianstad won the tournament in 1925 and 1928. A Provincial Championship for the clubs in Scania was first played in 1932, which IFK Kristianstad won in 1933 and 1935. In 1933–34, IFK Kristianstad played in an unofficial league consisting of teams from the cities of Kristianstad and Ystad, finishing second behind Ystads IF.

The team made its debut in the league system in 1935, coached by Oscar Meyer. At the time the Swedish Championship (Svenska mästerskapet, SM) was decided as a knockout tournament independent of the league. Until 1946, the tournament was contested only by the Provincial champions. In the league, Kristianstad reached the top division, at the time known as Allsvenskan, in 1936–37, but were immediately relegated. Meyer left as coach after that season and former SM winner Eskil Gustafsson was signed from Majornas IK as player-coach. They were promoted again in 1939 and finished second in the league that year. However, they failed to win the Provincial Championship and did not participate in SM. They finished second in the league again in 1940–41. They won their first SM gold in the same year, defeating second-tier IFK Uppsala in the final by 17–8.

First golden era (1945–1957)
In 1945, Gustafsson was replaced as coach by another player-coach, Karl Erik Nilsson. In Nilsson's first season, Kristianstad won the second division and were promoted back to the top division. In the same season they reached the SM semi-finals, where they were beaten by Majorna. From 1946 to 1957, Kristianstad finished top 4 in the league for 11 consecutive seasons. Behind this success was a core of players from the club's youth system, such as Carl-Erik Stockenberg, Åke Moberg, Bertil Rönndahl and Erik Nordström. In 1946–47, the team finished third in the league, but were eliminated by Ystads IF in the round of 16 of SM. Starting in this season, the SM tournament was contested by all top-flight teams and all Provincial  champions, as well as invited lower-league teams. Nilsson left in 1947 and Gustafsson returned as coach. In the first season after Gustafsson's return, Kristianstad finished second in the league behind Redbergslids IK. They won their second SM gold after beating Redbergslid in the final by 8–7. In 1948–49 they finished second in the league again, but their title defence in SM ended in the semi-finals against IFK Lidingö.

In 1949–50, Kristianstad won the league but were eliminated from SM by IK Baltichov in the round of 16. After that season, Gustafsson was replaced by co-player-coaches Karl Fridlundh, Moberg and Evert Sjunnesson. In their first season in charge, the club finished third in the league and reached the SM final, where they were beaten by second-tier team AIK. The following season they won the league and set up a re-match against AIK in the SM final after eliminating cross-town rivals Näsby IF in the semi-finals. They defeated AIK by 16–15 after extra time to win their third SM gold. After this season, the SM tournament was discontinued and the SM title was awarded to the league winners. In 1952–53, they won the league which earned them their fourth SM gold. They finished second in the league in the next two seasons, behind Redbergslid and IK Heim, respectively. In 1954, three Kristianstad players (Moberg, Sjunnesson and Stockenberg) were members of the Swedish team that won the country's first World Championship. Between 1953 and 1957, several key players left the team and their success started declining.

Title drought (1957–2007)
Kristianstad suffered two successive relegations in 1958 and 1959. After spending two seasons at the third level they were promoted to the second division, where they remained until being promoted back to Allsvenskan in 1970. By this time, a playoff tournament featuring the top 4 in the league had been introduced to determine the champions. The 1970s was the first time that the club featured a significant number of players from outside the Kristianstad area, including Thomas Persson, Einar Jakobsson and Lars-Göran Jönsson. In 1971–72, Sjunnesson coached the team to a fourth place in the league, earning them a spot in the playoffs, but they were eliminated by SoIK Hellas in the semi-finals. In 1972, Kristianstad players Sten Olsson and Persson were included in Sweden's squad for the Olympics. Coached by Leif Rosenberg, Kristianstad finished second in the league in 1974–75 and qualified for the playoffs. They won the semi-finals against Heim but lost the finals to Drott. The club was relegated in 1981 and only played 3 of 11 seasons in the top flight from 1981 to 1992.

From 1990–91 until 2002–03, Swedish league handball was split into autumn and spring leagues. The eight highest-ranked teams in the autumn edition of the top division, now known as Elitserien, qualified for the spring league whereas the remaining four were relegated to compete in Allsvenskan along with teams from each of the two second-tier Division 1 leagues. In 1994–95, coach Urban Harju led the team to sixth place in the spring league, which earned them a spot in the playoffs. However, they lost the quarter-final series. In 1996–97, now with Dragan Mihailovic as coach, they finished fifth in the spring league, but again lost the quarter-final series. The following season, they finished 11th in the league and were relegated after finishing 7th in Allsvenskan.

This relegation was followed by a period of financial trouble for the club. By the end of 2000, it had 2.7 million SEK in debt, and was unable to pay its players and staff. Additionally, in 2002, a former chairman and three board members were charged with tax evasion, being accused of having evaded taxes for payments of 1.7 million SEK between 1995 and 1997. Bankruptcy was a very real possibility for the club. However, the tax evasion trial was cancelled due to one of the suspects, whom the prosecutor believed to hold key information, falling severely ill. By 2003, the club had stabilised its economy and paid its debts. This period was also the club's on-field nadir; they sank as low as the fourth level in the spring of 2000 and the spring of 2002.

Start of resurgence (2007–2014)

A resurgence for the club started with the appointment of Kenneth Andersson as coach in 2007. In his first year, Kristianstad finished third in the second division and qualified for the promotion playoffs. However, they lost the series against Trelleborg. In 2008–09 they finished second in the division and were promoted automatically. In 2009, Kristianstad hired Nikolas Larsson as the club director. He has been credited with a major part in the club's recent success. From 2009 to 2016, the club's equity went from −1.3 million SEK to +6.1 million SEK, the highest in the league. During the same time, the club's revenue has increased from 5.6 million SEK to 32.4 million SEK, the second highest in the league behind IK Sävehof (whose numbers include the annual Partille Cup and a dominant women's team). Larsson left the club in 2018. In 2010, Kristianstad moved from Kristianstad Idrottshall to the newly built Kristianstad Arena. In both 2009–10 and 2010–11, they finished 11th in the league and narrowly avoided relegation after finishing second in the relegation league both times. Despite this, they had the highest average attendance in the league (2769) in 2010–11.

Over the next four seasons, Kristianstad would improve their finishing position each year. In 2011–12, they finished sixth in the league and qualified for the playoffs. In February that season, Andersson was replaced by Sweden coach Ola Lindgren, who continued to coach Sweden in addition to Kristanstad until 2016. They reached the SM final by upsetting league winners Guif by three games to two in a close semi-final series. However, they lost in the final against heavily favoured Sävehof by 29–21. Lindgren made major changes in the squad in his first few years in charge in order to strengthen the team and introduce the right "attitude" in the squad. In 2012–13, Kristianstad made their first appearance in a pan-European competition, as they participated in the EHF Cup. They were eliminated by Guif in the second qualifying round. They improved to third in the league and reached their second consecutive final, which they went on to lose against Drott in a very close match by 28–27. They participated in the EHF Cup again in the following season, where they reached the group stage, but finished last of the four teams in their group. Meanwhile, they finished second in the league for the first time since 1975, but lost the semi-finals to Lugi.

Second golden era (2014–present)

In 2014–15, the club was unable to qualify for the EHF Cup group stage, losing to German powerhouse HSV Hamburg in the last qualifying round on away goals. From 2014–15 to 2017–18, Kristianstad won both the regular season and the SM gold for four consecutive seasons. They defeated Alingsås in the final in the first three of these seasons, with the 2015 final being the closest. In 2015–16, they qualified for the Champions League, where only one spot is allocated to Sweden for the SM winners. They were placed in the top 16 (groups A and B), and finished seventh in their group on head-to-head record behind Montpellier, narrowly outside of the top six who advance to the next round. Domestically, they won 30 of 32 matches in the regular season and won the league by 16 points, eight wins ahead of second-place Alingsås. Kristianstad player Jerry Tollbring was selected for Sweden's squad in the 2016 Olympics. In the 2016–17 Champions League, Kristianstad were again placed in the top 16, but finished last in the group, a single point behind Zagreb for the knockout stage spots. For the third consecutive season, Kristianstad played in the top 16 of the Champions League in 2017–18. They advanced from the group stage for the first time before being eliminated by German club Flensburg-Handewitt. They won the 2018 SM final against HK Malmö by 23–22 after extra time. Lindgren resigned in January 2019 due to disagreements with the club, after they had decided not to extend his contract after the 2018–19 season. He was replaced by Ljubomir Vranjes. Kristianstad won their fifth consecutive regular season title that season, but were swept by Alingsås in the semi-finals. During the team's current era, they have had a lot of success in spite of frequently losing important players to foreign teams, including six full internationals in 2016, Tollbring and Nebojša Simić in 2017 and Albin Lagergren and Tim Sørensen in 2018.

Colours and crest
Unlike most IFK clubs, who play in blue and white kits, Kristianstad play in orange shirts. It is unclear why they use this colour. One explanation is that they chose the colour to avoid the need for an away kit, although this is unconfirmed. Club historian Alf Braun states that the team played in orange when the handball section started in the 1930s, and played the 1933 Provincial Championship final in orange shirts and brown trousers. He says that they later started using blue and white shirts in 1948, but switched back to orange during the 1950–51 season. According to former player Uno Kvist, they used blue and white in 1953 but later played "mostly" in orange.

The club does, however, have a blue and white logo. The logo features a four-pointed star, which is a symbol for IFK, on a shield split diagonally in a white and a blue half, along with the club's name and year of establishment. The logo has had a similar design at least since the early 1950s. The team had only the four-pointed star on their shirts until the 1970s, when they replaced it with the full logo.

Kits

Arenas

Kristianstad have had four different arenas. From 1935 to 1947, the team played in Södra kaserns gymnastiksal. The field was only 13.5 meters wide, which meant that the goal-area lines crossed the side lines rather than the outer goal lines. Due to these unusual dimensions, the arena was commonly known as Korridoren ("the Corridor"). The separation between the spectators and the field was poor and it was possible for fans to trip opposing players. While the official capacity of the arena was between 1200 and 1300, the record attendance is 1655 in a match against Djurgårdens IF in December 1939.

Between 1947 and 1964, Kristianstad played at Sporthallen, which was created from a rebuilt horse riding arena and only intended as a temporary solution. The arena only had stands at the short ends. The record attendance at Sporthallen is 2464, in a top-of-the-league clash against Redbergslids IK in February 1948. At the end of 1964, the team moved to Kristianstads Idrottshall (Idrottshallen), its first "proper" arena. It was the first arena of the club to host international matches. The record attendance for Kristianstad at Idrottshallen was 2701, well above the allowed capacity of the arena, in the final series against HK Drott in 1975.

Since 2010, Kristanstad play their home matches at Kristianstad Arena, which has a capacity of 5200. It is adjacent to Idrottshallen. Kristianstad played their first match at the new arena on 17 October 2010, a 31–31 draw against Redbergslid. Kristianstad's highest attendance at the arena is 5221 in the 2018 semi-finals against Lugi. Kristianstad Arena is a multi-purpose venue, which is also used for other sports (both major events, grassroot, and school sport), concerts and other events. The arena was one of the venues for the 2011 World Championship.

Supporters and rivalries
Kristianstad's official supporter club is Södra Kurvan ("the South Stand"). It was formed in 2010 as a reaction to the relative lack of atmosphere at home matches after the move from Kristianstad Idrottshall to Kristianstad Arena, due to an inability to fill the much larger arena. It is a nonprofit organisation with its own board and members. Since its establishment, Södra Kurvan has gained over 500 members. Kristianstad have drawn large crowds in recent years,  having the highest average attendance in the league every season from 2010–11 to 2018–19. The shirt number 8 is reserved for the fans, symbolising that they are the 8th player for the team.

While Kristianstad do not have a traditional rival, matches against other Scania teams, including OV Helsingborg HK, Lugi HF, HK Malmö, Ystads IF and IFK Ystad HK, are considered derbies.

Records and statistics

Kristianstad's all-time top scorer in the top division is Bo Ahlberg, who scored 926 goals between 1971 and 1986. He also holds the club records for most goals in all divisions (1724 goals), most top-flight matches played (222) and most consecutive matches with a goal (97). Johan Jepson has played the most matches for the club in all divisions, playing over 350 matches from 2006 to 2016.

Four Kristianstad players have been the top scorer in the highest division: Åke Moberg in 1946–47, Carl-Erik Stockenberg for five consecutive seasons from 1949–50 to 1953–54, Ahlberg in 1975–76 and Lennarth Ebbinge in 1976–77.

Kristianstad's largest winning margin in the top flight is 22 goals in a 39–17 win against Guif in the 2017 quarter-finals. Their biggest win in any division was a 42–12 (30 goals) win against Uddevalla HK in 2004. The club's largest losing margin in the top division is 21 goals against Redbergslid in 1995 (20–41) and 1997 (22–43), whereas their heaviest defeat in any division was a 15–47 (32 goals) loss to Stavstens IF in 1999. In 2014–15, Kristianstad won 20 consecutive league matches, a record in the top division. Between March 2015 and March 2019, the team had 80 consecutive wins in home matches against domestic opposition.

Players

Current squad
Squad for the 2022–23 season

Goalkeepers
1  Espen Christensen
 12  Gustaf Banke
 16  Hugo Rydberg
Wingers
LW
 20  Emil Frend Öfors
 21  Alfred Ehn
 44  Albin Leyman
RW
 30  Anton Halén
 42  Albin Selin
Line players
3  Besard Hakaj
 25  Ludvig Jurmala Åström
 46  Herman Josefsson

Back players
LB
4  Markus Olsson
6  Philip Henningsson
  Trym Johnsen
CB
 37  Zoran Bozic
 43  Isak Larsson
  Matias Helt Jepsen
RB
5  Hampus Henningsson
9  Anton Hallbäck
  Andreas Cederholm
  Isaac Biel Nilsen

Transfers
Transfers for the 2023-24 season

Joining

Leaving

Player records

Most appearances

All-time top goalscorers

* Only appearances and goals in the top division are included.

Management

Organisation
As of 6 August 2018

Technical

Notable coaches
This is a list of coaches who have won a Swedish Championship (SM) gold or silver, won the regular season or coached the team in five or more seasons.

Honours

Championships
Swedish Champions
 Winners (8): 1941, 1948, 1952, 1953, 2015, 2016, 2017, 2018
 Runners-up (6): 1951, 1954, 1955, 1975, 2012, 2013

League
Handbollsligan/Elitserien/Allsvenskan (First tier)
 Winners (8): 1950, 1952, 1953, 2015, 2016, 2017, 2018, 2019
 Runners-up (8): 1940, 1941, 1948, 1949, 1954, 1954, 1975, 2014
Allsvenskan/Division 1/Division 2 (Second tier)
 Winners (10): 1936, 1938, 1939, 1944, 1946, 1970, 1983, 1984, 1990, 1992
 Promoted (9): 1936, 1939, 1944, 1946, 1970, 1984, 1990, 1992, 2009

European record

Notes

References

External links
 
 

Swedish handball clubs
Idrottsföreningen Kamraterna
1899 establishments in Sweden
Sports clubs established in 1899
Handball clubs established in 1925
Sport in Skåne County
Sport in Kristianstad Municipality